"The Recipe" is a song by American rapper Kendrick Lamar. It was released on April 3, 2012, as the first single from his major label debut Good Kid, M.A.A.D City (2012). The song, however, only made the deluxe edition of the album.

The song, produced by West Coast record producer Scoop DeVille, features a guest appearance from Lamar's mentor, record producer and rapper Dr. Dre, who also mixed the record alongside TDE's engineer MixedByAli.

Background
On March 30, 2012, after speaking on his newly signed joint venture deal, which brought Top Dawg Entertainment under Interscope Records, Lamar announced on Big Boy's Neighborhood that he would premier his debut single "The Recipe", to the morning radio show on April 2. The song heavily samples "Meet the Frownies" as performed by Twin Sister.

Reception
The song has been well received by fans and critics alike. Carrie Battan of Pitchfork summarized the song as an "anthemic Californian pride cut". Nick Catucci of Rolling Stone jokingly wrote "You might get a contact high from this" and went on to write "Lamar’s wafting number has rolling boulders for a beat, lines about sunlight slanting through shades and Dre explaining, 'How many ways am I killin' 'em? Shit, right around a billion.'"

Music video
On May 30, 2012, Schoolboy Q released the behind-the-scenes photos of the song's music video, via his Instagram. However, the music video was never released. Another music video was released showing the duo performing the song at Coachella.

Remix
The song was later remixed, featuring verses from Lamar's Black Hippy cohorts – Ab-Soul, Jay Rock and Schoolboy Q. The remix was included as a bonus track on the Spotify deluxe edition of the album.
Chicago rapper Twista also made his own remix.

Track listing
Digital single

Charts

Certifications

Release history

References

External links
 

2012 songs
2012 singles
Kendrick Lamar songs
Songs written by Kendrick Lamar
Dr. Dre songs
Songs written by Dr. Dre
Song recordings produced by Scoop DeVille
Songs written by Scoop DeVille
Aftermath Entertainment singles
Interscope Records singles
Top Dawg Entertainment singles
Songs about cannabis
Songs about Los Angeles